The Banahao shrew-rat (Rhynchomys banahao) is a species of rodent in the genus Rhynchomys. It was described in 2007.

References

Rhynchomys
Mammals described in 2007
Rhynchomys banahao